This is a list of notable fountains in Greece.

See also 
 Plateia
 List of gates in Greece

Fountains in Europe
Tourist attractions in Greece
Fountains
Greece